Kamuki is a 2018 Indian Malayalam-language romantic comedy film written and directed by Binu Sadanandan, based on a true story. It stars Askar Ali, Aparna Balamurali, and Dain Davis, with Baiju Santhosh, Rony David, and Kavya Suresh in supporting roles. The film's score was composed by Gopi Sundar. The film is about a star-crossed romance between a blind young man, Harikrishnan, and a happy-go-lucky girl, Achamma.

Plot

Achamma Varghese / Achu is her father's favourite daughter. He makes her promise not to follow her sister's footsteps in eloping with a boy, he hopes Achu to be a good girl and faithful to the family. Achu and her friend Jeena pursue a master's degree in social work at Sree Shankara College. Achu keeps her promise until she meets Hari who is blind and always hangout with his buddy Jafar in college. Besides being blind, Hari has a clear vision of his future. Achu, on the other hand, prefers having fun instead of studying. One day during Onam celebration in the college, Achu confesses her love for Hari. However Hari turns her down citing that she is not serious in life. In reality, Hari doesn't want to be a burden on Achu. 

In college, the Professor of Social Works gets upset that the students are not serious about the profession and the course. He scolds them and totally ignores Achu that she is the least serious person in the college. This is a wake up call for Achu. She starts to help the needy and starts getting recognised by people and everyone is proud of her. 

Jafar talks to Hari and makes him realise that he too loves Achu. When Hari is about to confess his love for Achu, she tells him that let's continue as friends (not aware that Hari was about to confess his love). 

Hari wins Achu's heart with his positive attitude and determination, unfortunately, her family adamantly opposes this relationship because Hari is blind. In the end, during Holi celebrations at college, the entire college tries to convince Achu's father to allow for Achu and Hari's marriage. Achu's father agrees on one condition of hiding Achu within the college crowd and asking Hari to find Achu without any help. Hari is scared, but he tries to remember his mother's words of encouragement when he was a small kid and had lost his sight. Hari depends on his ability of smell and hearing to find Achu. Finally Achu's father has to agree. The focus is on Hari's mother who stands there and gives Achu's father a confident and determined look.

Cast
Askar Ali as Harikrishnan
Dain Davis as Jaffar
Aparna Balamurali as Achamma Varghese (Achu) 
Akshara Kishor as Young Achamma
Baiju as Varghese Master
Deepa Kartha as Mother of Askar Ali
Thushara Pillai as Mother of Achamma
Kavya Suresh as Jeena
Aneesh Gopal as Snehithan
Sibi Thomas as Rajesh
Rony David as James
Rosin Jolly as Lashmi Rajesh
Pradeep Kottayam as Principal
Joemon Joshy as JJ (Janaki Janardhanan)
Kiran Lal as Britto
Rahul Nair as Jayasankar
Binu Adimali as Sreeni
Dominic Dom as Sharuk khan
Mathukkutty as Doctor Narayanan Kutty

Music
The film music and score were composed by Gopi Sundar.

Reception 

The film received mixed reviews.

References

External links
 

2018 films
Romance films based on actual events
Indian romantic comedy films
2010s Malayalam-language films
2018 romance films